Spuž is a small town seated near Zeta river, within the municipality of Danilovgrad in the central Montenegrin region.

Overview
It is located halfway between Podgorica and Danilovgrad, in the Bjelopavlići valley. It was part of the Ottoman Empire between 1474 and 1878 and was kaza centre in Sanjak of Scutari before joining to Kingdom of Montenegro as "İşpozi".

It is known as the location of the Spuž prison complex (Zavod za izdržavanje kaznenih sankcija - ZIKS), the largest facility of that kind in Montenegro.

History 
In the 16th century, the population was composed of Serbs, Turks and Albanians. Albanians were noted to have their own mahalas (neighborhoods) within Spuž and Onogošt (Nikšić).

Demographics
According to the 2011 census, its population was 1,696.

Sports
The local football team is OFK Spuž, who play in the country's third tier. Former team Zora Spuž played in the second tier.

Transportation
Town is also a stop on Nikšić–Podgorica railway.

References

Books 

Populated places in Danilovgrad Municipality